Zaqistan, officially the Republic of Zaqistan, is a micronation in Box Elder County, Utah, created in 2005 by self-declared president Zaq Landsberg. Landsberg pays property taxes on the land, which has no residents or buildings on it, although he has installed monuments and a border patrol gate. The country grants citizenship for free to anyone who asks for it, with the option of obtaining a passport for a suggested US$50 fee.

Landsberg, a sculptor who lives in Brooklyn, bought the property in July 2005 for $610. Its size has been variously described as 2 acres and 4 acres. The nearest town is Montello, Nevada, about 60 miles away.

See also 
 List of micronations

References

Further reading

External links 
 
, upload by KSL-TV, September 2016, with exhibit at Central Utah Art Center

Micronations in the United States
Box Elder County, Utah